Indian Feudalism is a book by Indian professor Ram Sharan Sharma. The book analyses the practice of land grants, which became considerable in the Gupta period and widespread in the post-Gupta period. It shows how this led to the emergence of a class of landlords, endowed with fiscal and administrative rights superimposed upon a class of peasantry which was deprived of communal agrarian rights.

Professor Sharma studies in detail the basic relationships in early medieval society down to the eve of the Ghorian conquests. He argues in favour of a "feudalism largely realising the surplus from peasants mainly in kind through superior rights in their land and through forced labour, which is not found on any considerable scale... after the Turkish conquest of India."

The third revised edition of the book was published by Macmillan Publishers in 2005.

See also 
 Indian feudalism

References

History books about India
Historiography of India
Indian feudalism
Books by Ram Sharan Sharma
2005 non-fiction books